René-Aubert Vertot (25 November 1655 in Bennetot, Normandy – 15 June 1735 in Paris) was a French clergyman and historian.

He was for some time a pupil of the Jesuit Fathers seminary at Rouen, which he left at the end of two years to enter the Capuchin Order. His health was greatly impaired by his austerities there, and his family, alarmed, obtained permission for him to join the Premonstratensian Canons. Afterwards he was appointed pastor to several small parishes in Normandy. In 1690, at the suggestion of Fontenelle and the Abbé de Saint-Pierre, he wrote his Histoire de la conjuration de Portugal. The book was received with favour, and in 1695 appeared the Histoire des révolutions de Suède (History of the Swedish revolutions). In 1703 Vertot was made a member of the Académie des inscriptions. Besides contributions to the Mémoires of the Académie and other minor works, he wrote the Révolutions romains (1719) and Histoire des chevaliers hospitaliers de Saint-Jean de Jérusalem (History of the Knights Hospitallers), also known as Histoire de Malte (History of Malta). It is related, in connection with the latter, that in answer to an offer of additional data about the great siege by the Ottomans in 1565, he said, "Mon siège est fait" ("My siege is finished"), a phrase construed by some of his critics as an expression of his disregard for historical accuracy. Another interpretation of the comment is that he simply wished to get rid of an intruder who was trying to force upon him documents whose authenticity was very doubtful.

References

Further reading
. Cites:
VILLEMAIN, Tableau du huitième siècle;
RENOUARD, Catalogue d'un amateur, IV;
D'OLIVET, Hist. de l' Académie française.
Robert Thake, A Publishing History of a Prohibited Best-Seller: The Abbé de Vertot and his Histoire de Malte (Oak Knoll Press, 2016)

External links

 
 

Clergy from Normandy
1655 births
1735 deaths
17th-century French historians
18th-century French historians
Members of the Académie des Inscriptions et Belles-Lettres
Capuchins
Lycée Pierre-Corneille alumni
People from Seine-Maritime